There are several places known as Blind River:
 Blind River, Ontario, town in Canada
 Blind River in Algoma District, Ontario, Canada
 Blind River in New Zealand
 Blind River in Louisiana, United States

See also 
 Blind (disambiguation)